Baban Daware (born 1931) is an Indian wrestler. He competed in the men's freestyle flyweight at the 1956 Summer Olympics.

References

External links
 

1931 births
Possibly living people
Indian male sport wrestlers
Olympic wrestlers of India
Wrestlers at the 1956 Summer Olympics
Place of birth missing (living people)